Jacques Monod may refer to:

 Jacques Monod (1910–1976), French biochemist and Nobel Prize laureate
 Jacques Monod (actor) (1918–1985), French actor
 Jacques-Louis Monod, American composer